Magari may refer to:

Magari language, a variety of Bhil spoken in India
Magari, Estonia, a village in Kanepi Parish
Magari (wine), a Tuscan wine by Gaja estate Ca'Marcanda